The Taipei Golden Horse Film Festival and  Awards is a film festival and awards ceremony held annually in Taiwan. It was founded in 1962 by the Government Information Office of the Republic of China (ROC) in Taiwan. The awards ceremony is usually held in November or December in Taipei, although the event has also been held in other locations in Taiwan in recent times.

Overview
Since 1990 (the 27th awards ceremony), the festival and awards has been organized and funded by the Motion Picture Development Foundation R.O.C., which set up the Taipei Golden Horse Film Festival Executive Committee. The Committee consists of nine to fifteen film scholars and film scholars on the executive board, which includes the Chairman and CEO. Under the Committee, there are five different departments: the administration department for internal administrative affairs, guest hospitality and cross-industry collaboration; the marketing department which is responsible for event planning and promotion, advertising and publications; the project promotion department attending to the execution of the project meetings; the competition department which is in charge of the competition and awards ceremony; and the festival department which is devoted to festival planning, curation of films and invitation of filmmakers, subtitle transition and production and all on-site arrangements during the festival.

The awards ceremony is Taiwan’s equivalent to the Academy Awards. The awards are contested by Chinese-language submissions from Taiwan, Hong Kong, mainland China and elsewhere. It is one of the four major Chinese-language film awards, along with Hong Kong Film Award, Golden Rooster Awards and Hundred Flowers Awards, also among the most prestigious and respected film awards in the Chinese-speaking film industry. It is also one of the major annual awards presented in Taiwan along with Golden Bell Awards for television production and Golden Melody Awards for music.

The Golden Horse awards ceremony is held after a month-long festival showcasing some of the nominated feature films for the awards. A substantial number of the film winners in the history of the awards have been Hong Kong productions. The submission period is usually around July to August each year and nominations are announced around October with the ceremony held in November or December. Although it has been held once a year; however, it was stopped in 1964 and 1974 and boycotted in the after-ceremony in 2018. Winners are selected by a jury of judges and awarded a Golden Horse statuette during the broadcast ceremony.

History
In May 1962, the Government Information Office of the Republic of China (ROC) enacted the "Mandarin Film Award Regulation of Year 1962" to officially found the Golden Horse Awards. The name Golden Horse is a common political term that  originates from the islands of Kinmen, Quemoy, or "the Golden Gate" and Matsu or "the Ancestral Horse"( ), which are under ROC control. The reasons were purely political, as these islands were ROC offshore islands that protected them from the mainland, and were heavily fortified during the Cold War. This was to imply the ROC's sovereignty over territories controlled by the People's Republic of China.

The awards ceremony was established to boost the Chinese-language film industry and to award outstanding Chinese-language films and filmmakers. It is one of the most prestigious awards in the film industry in Asia. It has been helping the development of movies in Chinese as it provides great support and encouragement to the filmmakers. Moreover, it intends to introduce excellent films to Taiwanese audience from around the world to stimulate exchange of ideas and inspire creativity.

Entries and eligibility
The awards ceremony pays attention not only to commercial movies but also to artistic films and documentaries. There has been some criticism of this from those who believe that this will not help the Taiwanese commercial movie industry much. However, the awards ceremony plays a significant role in helping the movie industry and drawing more people’s attention to Chinese-language movies.

Under current regulations, any film made primarily in the Chinese language is eligible for competition. Since 1996, a liberalization act allows for films from mainland China to enter the Awards. Several awards have been given to mainland Chinese artists and films, including Jiang Wen's In the Heat of the Sun in 1996, Best Actor for Xia Yu in 1996, Joan Chen's Xiu Xiu: The Sent Down Girl in 1999, Best Actress for Qin Hailu in 2001 and Lu Chuan's Kekexili: Mountain Patrol in 2004.

Awards ceremonies

Award categories

Current categories

Discontinued categories

Hosts
For the first fourteen award ceremonies, there were no regular hosts for the ceremony. Hosts began since the fifteenth ceremony; that year's hosts were Ivy Ling Po and Wang Hao. Since then, there are usually two hosts every year, sometimes with a combination of one host from Hong Kong and the other from Taiwan. A significant number of celebrities have hosted the ceremony, such as Jackie Chan, Eric Tsang, Kevin Tsai and Dee Hsu. In 2012 (the 49th awards ceremony), Bowie Tsang and Huang Bo were the hosts and Huang Bo became the first host from Mainland China in the history of the Golden Horse Film Festival and Awards.

Records
 In 1972, the legendary martial artist and actor Bruce Lee won the Special Jury Award, Fist of Fury.
 Hong Kong actor Tony Leung Chiu-wai has won the most Best Leading Actor awards. He won this award in the 31st, 40th and 44th awards ceremony with Chungking Express, Infernal Affairs, and Lust, Caution. He also holds the record for actor with most nominations in the Best Actor category with 7 times.
 Hong Kong actress Maggie Cheung won the most Best Leading Actress awards. She won this award in the 26th, 28th, 34th and 37th awards ceremony with Full Moon in New York, Center Stage, Comrades: Almost a Love Story, and In the Mood for Love.
 In 2009, at the 46th awards ceremony, for the first time, two winners were jointly awarded Best Actor: Hong Kong actor Nick Cheung and Chinese actor Huang Bo.
 In 2006, at the 43rd awards ceremony, 9-year-old actor Ian Gouw was crowned Best Supporting Actor for his performance in After This Our Exile. He became the youngest winner in the history of the awards.
 Taiwanese actress Loretta Yang was named Best Leading Actress in the 21st and 22nd awards ceremony. She is the first actress who won this award for two consecutive years.
 Hong Kong actor Jackie Chan took the Best Leading Actor award at the 29th and 30th awards ceremony. He is the first actor who won this award for two consecutive years.
 Hong Kong actor Anthony Wong has won the most Best Supporting Actor awards. He won this award in the 39th, 40th and 42nd awards ceremony with the movies Xiang Fei, Infernal Affairs and Initial D.
 Chinese actress Wang Lai has won the most Best Supporting Actress awards. She won this award in the 3rd, 18th, 25th and 28th awards ceremony with the movies, Ren Zhi Chu, Xiao Hu Lu, People Between Two China, and Pushing Hands.
 Chinese director and actress Joan Chen is the first person who won awards across two categories, the Best Director (in 1998 for Xiu Xiu: The Sent Down Girl) and the Best Leading Actress. Moreover, she was the first female to win this award.
 In 2012, the 49th awards ceremony, Huang Bo became the first host from China.
 Also in 2012, Hong Kong actor Chapman To was nominated as the Best Actor for the movie Vulgaria and the Best Supporting Actor for the movie Diva. He is the only person who is nominated in these two categories in the same year.
 In 2015, Taiwanese actress Karena Lam became the first person to have won the triple acting awards: Best Leading Actress, Best Supporting Actress and Best New Performer.
 In 2017, at age 14, Taiwanese actress Vicky Chen became the youngest person to have won the Best Supporting Actress award. She is also the only performer to have been nominated for two acting awards (Best Leading Actress and Best Supporting Actress) for that year.
In 2020, at age 81 Taiwanese actress Chen Shu-fang became the first and oldest actress to win both Best Leading Actress and Best Supporting Actress in the same year.

References

External links
 Official website 
 Official website 
 
 Golden Horse Film Festival at the Internet Movie Database
 Taiwan Culture Portal: 47th Golden Horse Awards Herald a Renaissance in Taiwan’s Film Industry 

 
Film festivals in Taiwan
Awards established in 1962
1962 establishments in Taiwan
Film festivals established in 1962